"Let It Roll" is a song by American rapper Flo Rida from his fourth studio album, Wild Ones. The song was written by Earl King, Mike Caren, soFLY & Nius, Flo Rida, Axwell, Breyan Isaac, Antonio "Jovii Hendrix" Mobley and produced by soFLY & Nius and Axwell. Part two of the song features American rapper Lil Wayne and is featured on the soundtrack of the football video game FIFA 13. It was also performed on the 2012 edition of the WWE Tribute to the Troops event. Part one also appears as DLC in Dance Central 3, which was released on 2012. The song appeared on The CW TV Now promo.

The song samples a portion of Freddie King's version of the Earl King song "Come On (Let the Good Time Roll)" (1974). The chorus is derived in part from Earl King's original, which Jimi Hendrix famously covered. Hendrix is referenced in the lyrics.

Track listing

Music video
A music video for the song was released on November 26, 2012 directed by Jessy Terrero.

Charts and certifications

Weekly charts

Year-end charts

Certifications

Release history

References

2011 songs
Flo Rida songs
Song recordings produced by SoFly and Nius
Songs written by Axwell
Songs written by Breyan Isaac
Music videos directed by Jessy Terrero
Songs written by Mike Caren
Songs written by Antonio Mobley
2013 singles
Songs written by Lil Wayne
Atlantic Records singles